William Campbell McLean (June 10, 1854 – December 14, 1944) was a justice of the Supreme Court of Mississippi from October 11, 1911 to May 10, 1912. He succeeded W. D. Anderson. McLean was appointed to the seat form Grenada County, Mississippi, and retired from the court the following year.

References

1854 births
1944 deaths
Justices of the Mississippi Supreme Court
20th-century American judges